Serenade to Sweden is an album by American pianist, composer and bandleader Duke Ellington and vocalist Alice Babs recorded in 1963 and released on the Reprise label in 1966. The album was released on CD in 2017 by Real gone music.

Track listing

Recorded at Studio Hoche, Paris on February 28 (tracks 5, 9 & 14) and March 1 (tracks 1-4, 6-8 & 10-13), 1963.

Personnel
Duke Ellington – piano (tracks 1-11, 13 & 14)
Alice Babs - vocals
Georges Barboteu - french horn (tracks 5, 9 & 14)
Billy Strayhorn - piano (track 12)
Kenny Clarke (tracks 1-4, 6-8 & 10-13), Gilbert Rovere (tracks 5, 9 & 14) - bass 
Sam Woodyard - drums

References

Reprise Records albums
Duke Ellington albums
1966 albums
Alice Babs albums